The Soviet invasion of Manchuria, formally known as the Manchurian strategic offensive operation or simply the Manchurian operation, began on 9 August 1945 with the Soviet invasion of the Japanese puppet state of Manchukuo. It was the largest campaign of the 1945 Soviet–Japanese War, which resumed hostilities between the Union of Soviet Socialist Republics and the Empire of Japan after almost six years of peace. Since 1983, the operation has sometimes been called Operation August Storm after U.S. Army historian David Glantz used this title for a paper on the subject.

Soviet gains on the continent were Manchukuo, Mengjiang (the northeast section of present-day Inner Mongolia) and northern Korea. The Soviet entry into the war and the defeat of the Kwantung Army was a significant factor in the Japanese government's decision to surrender unconditionally, as it became apparent that the Soviet Union had no intention of acting as a third party in negotiating an end to hostilities on conditional terms.

Summary

As agreed with the United Kingdom and the United States (Western Allies) at the Tehran Conference in November 1943 and the Yalta Conference in February 1945, the Soviet Union entered World War II's Pacific Theater within three months of the end of the war in Europe. The invasion began on 9 August 1945, exactly three months after the German surrender on May 8 (9 May, 0:43 Moscow time).

Although the commencement of the invasion fell between the American atomic bombing of Hiroshima, on 6 August, and only hours before the Nagasaki bombing on 9 August, the timing of the invasion had been planned well in advance and was determined by the timing of the agreements at Tehran and Yalta, the long-term buildup of Soviet forces in the Far East since Tehran, and the date of the German surrender some three months earlier; on August 3, Marshal Vasilevsky reported to Premier Joseph Stalin that, if necessary, he could attack on the morning of 5 August.

At 11 p.m. Trans-Baikal (UTC+10) time on 8 August 1945, Soviet foreign minister Vyacheslav Molotov informed Japanese ambassador Naotake Satō that the Soviet Union had declared war on Japan, and that from 9 August the Soviet government would consider itself to be at war with Japan. At one minute past midnight Trans-Baikal time on 9 August 1945, the Soviets commenced their invasion simultaneously on three fronts to the east, west and north of Manchuria:

 Khingan–Mukden offensive operation (9 August 1945 – 2 September 1945) (Lesser Khingan-Mukden area);
 Harbin–Kirin offensive operation (9 August 1945 – 2 September 1945) (Harbin-Jilin area); and
 Sungari offensive operation (9 August 1945 – 2 September 1945).

Though the battle extended beyond the borders traditionally known as Manchuria—that is, the traditional lands of the Manchus—the coordinated and integrated invasions of Japan's northern territories has also been called the Battle of Manchuria. It has also been referred to as the Manchurian strategic offensive operation.

Background and buildup

The Russo-Japanese War of the early 20th century resulted in a Japanese victory and the Treaty of Portsmouth by which, in conjunction with other later events including the Mukden Incident and Japanese invasion of Manchuria in September 1931, Japan eventually gained control of Korea, Manchuria and South Sakhalin. In the late 1930s there were a number of Soviet-Japanese border incidents, the most significant being the Battle of Lake Khasan (Changkufeng Incident, July–August 1938) and the Battle of Khalkhin Gol (Nomonhan Incident, May–September 1939), which led to the Soviet–Japanese Neutrality Pact of April 1941. The Neutrality Pact freed up forces from the border incidents and enabled the Soviets to concentrate on their war with Germany, and the Japanese to concentrate on their southern expansion into Asia and the Pacific Ocean.

With success at Stalingrad, and the eventual defeat of Germany becoming increasingly certain, the Soviet attitude to Japan changed, both publicly, with Stalin making speeches denouncing Japan, and "privately", with the Soviets building up forces and supplies in the Far East. At the Tehran Conference (November 1943), amongst other things, Stalin, Winston Churchill, and Franklin Roosevelt agreed that the Soviet Union would enter the war against Japan once Germany was defeated. Stalin faced a dilemma: he wanted to avoid a two-front war at almost any cost yet the Soviet leader also wanted to extract gains in the Far East as well as Europe. The only way Stalin could make Far Eastern gains without a two-front war would be for Germany to capitulate before Japan.

Due to the Soviet–Japanese Neutrality Pact, the Soviets made it policy to intern Allied aircrews who landed in Soviet territory following operations against Japan, although airmen held in the Soviet Union under such circumstances were usually allowed to "escape" after some period of time. Nevertheless, even before the defeat of Germany the Soviet buildup in the Far East steadily accelerated. By early 1945 it had become apparent to the Japanese that the Soviets were preparing to invade Manchuria, though they were unlikely to attack prior to Germany's defeat. In addition to their problems in the Pacific, the Japanese realised they needed to determine when and where a Soviet invasion would occur.

At the Yalta Conference (February 1945), amongst other things, Stalin secured from Roosevelt the promise of Stalin's Far Eastern territorial desires, in return for agreeing to enter the Pacific War within two or three months of the defeat of Germany. By the middle of March 1945, things were not going well in the Pacific for the Japanese, and they withdrew their elite troops from Manchuria to support actions in the Pacific. Meanwhile, the Soviets continued their Far Eastern buildup. The Soviets had decided that they did not wish to renew the Neutrality Pact. The terms of the Neutrality Pact required that 12 months before its expiry, the Soviets must advise the Japanese of this, so on 5 April 1945 they informed the Japanese that they did not wish to renew the treaty. This caused the Japanese considerable concern, but the Soviets went to great efforts to assure the Japanese that the treaty would still be in force for another twelve months, and that the Japanese had nothing to worry about.

On 9 May 1945 (Moscow time), Germany surrendered, meaning that if the Soviets were to honour the Yalta agreement, they would need to enter war with Japan by 9 August 1945. The situation continued to deteriorate for the Japanese, and they were now the only Axis power left in the war. They were keen to remain at peace with the Soviets and extend the Neutrality Pact, and they were also keen to achieve an end to the war. Since Yalta they had repeatedly approached, or tried to approach, the Soviets in order to extend the Neutrality Pact, and to enlist the Soviets in negotiating peace with the Western Allies. The Soviets did nothing to discourage these Japanese hopes, and drew the process out as long as possible (whilst continuing to prepare their invasion forces). One of the roles of the Cabinet of Admiral Baron Suzuki, which took office in April 1945, was to try to secure any peace terms short of unconditional surrender. In late June, they approached the Soviets (the Neutrality Pact was still in place), inviting them to negotiate peace with the Western Allies in support of Japan, providing them with specific proposals and in return they offered the Soviets very attractive territorial concessions. Stalin expressed interest, and the Japanese awaited the Soviet response. The Soviets continued to avoid providing a response. The Potsdam Conference was held from 16 July to 2 August 1945. On 24 July the Soviet Union recalled all embassy staff and families from Japan. On 26 July the conference produced the Potsdam Declaration whereby Churchill, Harry S. Truman and Chiang Kai-shek (the Soviet Union was not officially at war with Japan) demanded the unconditional surrender of Japan. The Japanese continued to wait for the Soviet response, and avoided responding to the declaration.

The Japanese had been monitoring Trans-Siberian Railway traffic and Soviet activity to the east of Manchuria and in conjunction with the Soviet delaying tactics, this suggested to them that the Soviets would not be ready to invade east Manchuria before the end of August. They did not have any real idea, and no confirming evidence, as to when or where any invasion would occur. They had estimated that an attack was not likely in August 1945 or before Spring 1946; but the Stavka had planned for a mid-August 1945 offensive and had concealed the buildup of a force of 90 divisions. Many had crossed Siberia in their vehicles to avoid straining the rail link. 

The Japanese were caught completely by surprise when the Soviets declared war an hour before midnight on 8 August 1945, and invaded simultaneously on three fronts just after midnight on 9 August.

Combatant forces

Soviets
The Far East Command, under Marshal of the Soviet Union Aleksandr Vasilevsky, had a plan to conquer Manchuria that was simple but huge in scale, calling for a massive pincer movement over all of Manchuria. This was to be performed by the Transbaikal Front from the west and by the 1st Far Eastern Front from the east; the 2nd Far Eastern Front was to attack the center of the pocket from the north. The only Soviet equivalent of a theater command that operated during the war (apart from the short-lived 1941 "Directions" in the west), Far East Command, consisted of three Red Army fronts.

Transbaikal Front

The Transbaikal Front, under Marshal Rodion Malinovsky, included:
17th Army
36th Army
39th Army
53rd Army
6th Guards Tank Army
Soviet Mongolian Cavalry Mechanized Group under Issa Pliyev
12th Air Army.

The Transbaikal Front was to form the western half of the Soviet pincer movement, attacking across the Inner Mongolian desert and over the Greater Khingan mountains. These forces had as their objectives firstly to secure Mukden (present day Shenyang), then to meet troops of the 1st Far Eastern Front at the Changchun area in south central Manchuria, and in doing so finish the double envelopment.

Amassing over one thousand tanks and self-propelled guns, the 6th Guards Tank Army was to serve as an armored spearhead, leading the Front's advance and capturing objectives  inside Manchuria by the fifth day of the invasion.

The 36th Army was also attacking from the west, but with the objective of meeting forces of the 2nd Far Eastern Front at Harbin and Tsitsihar.

1st Far Eastern Front
The 1st Far Eastern Front, under Marshal Kirill Meretskov, included:
1st Red Banner Army
5th Army
25th Army
35th Army
10th Mechanized Corps
9th Air Army.

The 1st Far Eastern Front was to form the eastern half of the pincer movement. This attack involved the 1st Red Banner Army, the 5th Army and the 10th Mechanized Corps striking towards Mudanjiang (or Mutanchiang). Once that city was captured, this force was to advance towards the cities of Jilin (or Kirin), Changchun and Harbin. Its final objective was to link up with the forces of the Transbaikal Front at Changchun and Jilin thus closing the double envelopment movement.

As a secondary objective, the 1st Far Eastern Front was to prevent Japanese forces from escaping to Korea, and then invade the Korean Peninsula up to the 38th parallel, establishing in the process what later became North Korea. This secondary objective was to be carried out by the 25th Army. Meanwhile, the 35th Army was tasked with capturing the cities of Boli (or Poli), Linkou and Mishan.

2nd Far Eastern Front
The 2nd Far Eastern Front, under General Maksim Purkayev, included:
2nd Red Banner Army
15th Army
16th Army (whose 56th Rifle Corps was its only formation to see combat, on South Sakhalin)
5th Separate Rifle Corps
Chuguevsk Operational Group
Amur Military Flotilla
10th Air Army

The 2nd Far Eastern Front was deployed in a supporting attack role. Its objectives were the cities of Harbin and Tsitsihar, and to prevent an orderly withdrawal to the south by the Japanese forces. The front also included the 88th Separate Rifle Brigade, composed of Chinese and Korean guerrillas of the Northeast Anti-Japanese United Army who had retreated into the USSR in the beginning of the 1940s. The unit, led by Zhou Baozhong, was set to participate in the invasion for use in sabotage and reconnaissance missions, but was considered too valuable to be sent into the battlefield. They were thus withheld from participating in combat and instead used for leadership and administrative positions for district offices and police stations in the liberated areas during the subsequent occupation. The Korean battalion of the brigade (including future leader of the DPRK, Kim Il-sung) were also sent to assist in the following occupation of Northern Korea as part of the 1st Far Eastern Front.

Once troops from the 1st Far Eastern Front and Transbaikal Front captured the city of Changchun, the 2nd Far Eastern Front was to attack the Liaotung Peninsula and seize Port Arthur (present day Lüshun).

Each front had "front units" attached directly to the front instead of an army. The forces totaled 89 divisions with 1.5 million men, 3,704 tanks, 1,852 self propelled guns, 85,819 vehicles and 3,721 aircraft. Approximately one-third of its strength was in combat support and services. The Soviet plan incorporated all of the experience in maneuver warfare that they had acquired in fighting the Germans.

Japanese
The Kwantung Army of the Imperial Japanese Army, under General Otozo Yamada, was the major part of the Japanese occupation forces in Manchuria and Korea, and consisted of two Area Armies and three independent armies:
First Area Army (northeastern Manchukuo), including:
3rd Army
5th Army
Third Area Army (southwestern Manchukuo), including:
30th Army
44th Army
Independent units:
4th Army (an independent field army responsible for northern Manchuria)
34th Army (an independent field army responsible for the areas between the Third and Seventeenth Area Armies in northern Korea)
Seventeenth Area Army (responsible for Korea; assigned to the Kwantung Army at the eleventh hour, to no avail)

Each Area Army (Homen Gun, the equivalent of a Western "army") had headquarters units and units attached directly to the Area Army, in addition to the field armies (the equivalent of a Western corps). In addition, the Japanese were assisted by the forces of their puppet states of Manchukuo and Mengjiang. Manchukuo had an army of about 170,000 to 200,000 troops, while Mengjiang had around 44,000 troops, with the majority of these puppet troops being of dubious quality. Korea, the next target for the Soviet Far East Command, was garrisoned by the Japanese Seventeenth Area Army.

Including the Japanese forces in Korea, the Kwantung Army had over 900,000 men in 31 divisions and 13 brigades; there were about 400 obsolescent tanks and 2,000 aircraft (of the 1040 aircraft in Manchuria, only 230 were combat types and 55 were modern). However, the Kwantung Army was far below its authorized strength; most of its heavy equipment and all of its best military units had transferred to the Pacific Theater over the previous three years to contend with the advance of American forces. Some Kwantung Army units had also re-deployed south against the Nationalist Chinese in Operation Ichigo in 1944. By 1945 the Kwantung Army contained a large number of raw recruits and conscripts, with generally obsolete, light, or otherwise limited equipment. Almost all of the tanks were early 1930s models such as the Type 95 Ha-Go and Type 89 I-Go, the anti-tank units only possessed Type 1 37 mm anti-tank guns that were ineffective against Soviet armor, and the infantry had very few machine-guns and no anti-materiel rifles or submachine guns. As a result, the Japanese forces in Manchuria and Korea had essentially been reduced to a light-infantry counter-insurgency force with limited mobility and limited ability to fight a conventional land war against a coordinated enemy. In fact, only six of the Kwantung Army's divisions existed prior to January 1945. Accordingly, the Japanese regarded none of the Kwantung Army's units as combat ready, with some units being declared less than 15% ready.

The Imperial Japanese Navy did not contribute to the defense of Manchuria, the occupation of which it had always opposed on strategic grounds. Additionally, by the time of the Soviet invasion, the few remnants of its fleet were stationed and tasked for the defense of the Japanese home islands in the event of an invasion by American forces.

Compounding their problems, the Japanese military made many wrong assumptions and major mistakes, most significantly:
They wrongly assumed that any attack coming from the west would follow either the old railway line to Hailar, or head into Solun from the eastern tip of Mongolia. The Soviets did attack along those routes, but their main attack from the west went through the supposedly impassable Greater Khingan range south of Solun and into the center of Manchuria.
Japanese military intelligence failed to determine the nature, location and scale of the Soviet buildup in the Soviet Far East. Based upon an initial underestimation of Soviet strength and on the monitoring of Soviet traffic on the Trans-Siberian railway, the Japanese believed that the Soviets would not have sufficient forces in place for an offensive before the end of August 1945, and that an attack was most likely in the autumn of 1945 or in the spring of 1946.

Due to the withdrawal of the Kwantung Army's elite forces for redeployment into the Pacific Theater, the Japanese made new operational plans during the summer of 1945 for the defence of Manchuria against a seemingly inevitable Soviet attack. These called for redeploying the bulk of available forces from the border areas; the borders were to be held lightly and delaying actions were to be fought while the main force was to hold the southeastern corner in strength (so defending Korea from attack).

Further, the Japanese had observed Soviet activity only on the Trans-Siberian railway and along the east Manchurian front, and accordingly prepared for an invasion from the east. They believed that when an attack occurred from the west, the redeployed forces would be able to deal with it.

Although the Japanese redeployment in Manchukuo had begun, it was not due for completion until September 1945, and hence the Kwantung Army was in the midst of redeploying when the Soviets launched their attack simultaneously on all three fronts.

Campaign

The operation was carried out as a classic double pincer movement over an area the size of the entire Western European theatre of World War II. In the western pincer, the Red Army advanced over the deserts and mountains from Mongolia, far from their resupply railways. This confounded the Japanese military analysis of Soviet logistics, and the defenders were caught by surprise in unfortified positions. The Kwantung Army commanders were engaged in a planning exercise at the time of the invasion, and were away from their forces for the first eighteen hours of conflict.

Japanese communication infrastructure was poor, and the Japanese lost communication with forward units very early on. However, the Kwantung Army had a formidable reputation as fierce and relentless fighters, and even though understrength and unprepared, put up strong resistance at the town of Hailar which tied down some of the Soviet forces. The Japanese defenders held out until 18 August, when 3,827 survivors surrendered.  At the same time, Soviet airborne units seized airfields and city centers in advance of the land forces, and aircraft ferried fuel to those units that had outrun their supply lines.

Due to Japanese 37mm and 47mm anti-tank guns being only suitable for fighting light Soviet tanks, Japanese forces decided to use suicide bomber squads strapped with grenades and explosives as their main improvised anti-tank weapon.

There are some reports that Japanese Army aviation were using kamikaze planes to attempt to stop the Soviet advance.

Nevertheless, the prospect of a quick defeat to the Japanese Army seemed far from clear. Given the fanatical and sometimes suicidal resistance put up by the Japanese forces similar in April-June 1945 Battle of Okinawa, there was every reason to believe that a long, difficult campaign for the capture of the last remaining Japanese fortified areas was expected. In some parts of the Soviet offensive these expectations were fulfilled.

The Soviet pincer from the East crossed the Ussuri and advanced around Khanka Lake and attacked towards Suifenhe, and although Japanese defenders fought hard and provided strong resistance, the Soviets proved overwhelming.

After a week of fighting, during which time Soviet forces had penetrated deep into Manchukuo, Japan's Emperor Hirohito recorded the Gyokuon-hōsō which was broadcast on radio to the Japanese nation on 15 August 1945. It made no direct reference to a surrender of Japan, instead stating that the government had been instructed to accept the terms of the Potsdam Declaration fully. This created confusion in the minds of many listeners who were not sure if Japan had surrendered. The poor audio quality of the radio broadcast, as well as the formal courtly language in which the speech was composed, worsened the confusion.

The Imperial Japanese Army Headquarters did not immediately communicate the cease-fire order to the Kwantung Army, and many elements of the army either did not understand it, or ignored it. Hence, pockets of fierce resistance from the Kwantung Army continued, and the Soviets continued their advance, largely avoiding the pockets of resistance, reaching Mukden, Changchun and Qiqihar by 20 August. The cease-fire order was eventually communicated to the Kwantung Army, but not before the Soviets had made most of their territorial gains.

On the Soviet right flank, the Soviet-Mongolian Cavalry-Mechanized Group entered Inner Mongolia and quickly took Dolon Nur and Kalgan. The Emperor of Manchukuo (and former Emperor of China), Puyi, was captured by the Red Army.

On August 18, several Soviet amphibious landings were conducted ahead of the land advance: three landings in northern Korea, one landing in South Sakhalin, and one landing in the Kuril Islands. This meant that, in Korea at least, there were already Soviet soldiers waiting for the troops coming overland. In South Sakhalin and the Kurils, it meant a sudden establishment of Soviet sovereignty.

The land advance was stopped a good distance short of the Yalu River, the start of the Korean Peninsula, when even aerial supply became unavailable. The forces already in Korea were able to establish control in the peninsula's northern area. In accordance with arrangements made earlier with the American government to divide the Korean Peninsula, Soviet forces stopped at the 38th parallel, leaving the Japanese still in control of the southern part of the peninsula. Later, on 8 September 1945, American forces landed at Incheon.

Aftermath

The invasion of Manchuria was a factor that contributed to the surrender of Japan and the end of World War II. In addition, the Soviet occupation of Manchuria, along with the northern portions of the Korean Peninsula, allowed for those regions to be transferred by the Soviet Union into the control of local communists. The control of these regions by communist governments backed by Soviet authorities would be a factor in the rise of the Chinese Communists and shape the political conflict of the Korean War.

Several thousand Japanese who were sent as colonizers to Manchukuo and Inner Mongolia were left behind in China. The majority of Japanese left behind in China were women, and these Japanese women mostly married Chinese men and became known as "stranded war wives" (zanryu fujin). Because they had children fathered by Chinese men, Japanese women were not allowed to bring their Chinese families back with them to Japan, so most of them stayed. Japanese law only allowed children fathered by Japanese fathers to become Japanese citizens.

In late 1949, numerous members of the former Kwantung Army who had been captured in the Soviet invasion of Manchuria were convicted in connection with the activities of Unit 731, and related units for their connections with crimes against humanity and the use of chemical and biological weapons.

War crimes

During the invasion of Manchuria, Soviet soldiers killed and raped Japanese civilians. The most famous example was the Gegenmiao massacre, Soviet soldiers from an armoured unit massacred over one thousand Japanese women and children. Property of the Japanese were also looted by the Soviet troops. Soviet forces responsible for the massacre had carried out the same crimes against civilians in East Prussia. 

According to Soviet historian Vyacheslav Zimonin, many Japanese settlers committed mass suicide as the Red Army approached. Mothers were forced by Japanese military to kill their own children before killing or being killed themselves. The Japanese army often took part in the killings of its civilians. The commander of the 5th Japanese Army, General Shimizu, commented that "each nation lives and dies by its own laws." Wounded Japanese soldiers who were incapable of moving on their own were often left to die as the army retreated.

British and U.S. reports indicate that the Soviet troops that occupied Manchuria (about 700,000) also looted and terrorized the local people of Mukden and were not discouraged by Soviet authorities from "three days of rape and pillage". In Harbin, Soviet forces ignored protests from Chinese Communist Party leaders on the mass rape and looting. There were several incidents in which Chinese police forces in Manchuria arrested or even killed Soviet troops for committing various crimes, leading to some conflicts between the Soviet and Chinese authorities in Manchuria.

During the Soviet occupation of North Korea, it was also reported that Soviet soldiers also committed rape against both Japanese and Korean women alike in the northern half of the Korean peninsula. Soviet soldiers also looted the property of both Japanese and Koreans living in northern Korea. The Soviets laid claim to Japanese enterprises in Manchuria and northern Korea and took valuable materials and industrial equipment.

Konstantin Asmolov of the Center for Korean Research of the Russian Academy of Sciences dismisses Western accounts of Soviet violence against civilians in the Far East as exaggeration and rumor and contends that accusations of mass crimes by the Red Army inappropriately extrapolate isolated incidents regarding the nearly 2,000,000 Soviet troops in the Far East into mass crimes. According to him, such accusations are refuted by the documents of the time, from which it is clear that such crimes were far less of a problem than in Germany. Asmolov further asserts that the Soviets prosecuted their perpetrators while prosecution of German and Japanese "rapists and looters" in WWII was virtually unknown.

See also
 Foreign interventions by the Soviet Union
 Japanese settlers in Manchuria
 Military history of Japan
 Military history of the Soviet Union
 Mongolia in World War II
 Outer Manchuria
 Russian invasion of Manchuria
 Soviet invasion of Xinjiang
 War crimes in Manchukuo

Explanatory notes

References

External links 

 Japanese in Manchuria and Korea following the war

1945 in China
1945 in Japan
1945 in Mongolia
1945 in the Japanese colonial empire
1945 in the Soviet Union
August 1945 events in Asia
Battles involving Manchukuo
Battles involving Mongolia
Manchuria
Battles of World War II involving Japan
Conflicts in 1945
History of Inner Mongolia
History of Manchuria
Manchuria
Japan–Soviet Union relations
Kwantung Army
Kwantung Leased Territory
Manchukuo
Mengjiang
Mongolia–Soviet Union relations
Wars involving Manchukuo
World War II invasions
World War II operations and battles of the Pacific theatre
Manchuria